, is a Japanese animation studio founded in April 2007 by Gaku Iwasa. The studio's most successful productions include adaptations of Steins;Gate,  Re:Zero − Starting Life in Another World, and Akame ga Kill!.

History
The studio was founded in April 2007 by Gaku Iwasa and other former staff members of OLM's Team Iwasa, which Iwasa lead. Their first production was the anime series Tears to Tiara. Since then, White Fox has animated shows like Steins;Gate and Re:Zero and Akame ga Kill!.

Works

Television series

OVA/ONAs

Films

Video games

References

External links

  
 
 
 

 
Animation studios in Tokyo
Japanese animation studios
Japanese companies established in 2007
Mass media companies established in 2007
Suginami